Houston Township may refer to the following townships in the United States:

 Houston Township, Adams County, Illinois
 Houston Township, Houston County, Minnesota